John Dick-Lauder may refer to:

Sir John Dick-Lauder, 8th Baronet
Sir John Dick-Lauder, 11th Baronet

See also
John Lauder (disambiguation)